Chhatna Assembly constituency is an assembly constituency in Bankura district in the Indian state of West Bengal.

Overview
As per orders of the Delimitation Commission, No. 248 Chhatna Assembly constituency is composed of the following: Chhatna community development block; Veduasol, Brahmandiha, Hatgram, Indpur and Raghunathpur gram panchayats of Indpur community development block.

Chhatna  Assembly constituency  is part of No. 36 Bankura (Lok Sabha constituency).

Members of Legislative Assembly

Election results

2021

2016

2011

.# Swing calculated on Congress+Trinamool Congress vote percentages taken together in 2006.

1977-2006
In the 2006 state assembly elections, Anath Bandhu Mondal of RSP won the Chhatna assembly seat defeating his nearest rival Mahasweta Mondal of Trinamool Congress. Contests in most years were multi cornered but only winners and runners are being mentioned. Subhas Goswami of RSP won the seat six times in a row defeating Swapan Mondal of Trinamool Congress/ Congress in 2001 and 1996, Santi Singha of Congress in 1991, Tapan Banerjee of Congress in 1987, Arun Patra of Congress in 1982 and Kamalakanta Hembram of Congress in 1977.

1951-1972
Kamalakanta Hembram of Congress won in 1972 and 1971. Sudarson Singh of SSP won in 1969. J.Koley of Congress won in 1967. Kamalakanta Hembram of Congress won in 1962. Chhatna had a dual seat in 1957. Dhirendranath Chattopadhyay and Kamalakanta Hembram, both of Congress won in 1957. Probodh Chandra Dutta of Hindu Mahasabha and Kamalakanta Hembram of Congress both won in independent India’s first election in 1951.

References

Assembly constituencies of West Bengal
Politics of Bankura district